An election to the Llandeilo Rural District Council was held in April 1913. It was preceded by the 1910 election and, due to the scheduled 1916 election being postponed due to the First World War, was followed by the 1919 election. The majority of members were returned unopposed. The successful candidates were also elected to the Llandeilo Board of Guardians.

Ward Results

Bettws (three seats)

Brechfa (one seat)

Glynamman (one seat)

Llandebie (three seats)
An additional seat had been allocated to this ward.

Blaenau (Llandebie) (two seats)

Llandeilo Fawr North Ward (three seats)

Llandeilo Fawr South Ward (two seats)

Llandyfeisant (one seat)

Llanegwad (three seats)

Llanfihangel Aberbythych (two seats)

Llanfihangel Cilfragen (one seat)

Llanfynydd (two seats)

Llangathen (two seats)

Llansawel (two seats)

Quarter Bach No.1 (one seat)

Quarter Bach No.2 (one seat)

Talley (two seats)

Llandeilo Board of Guardians

All members of the District Council also served as members of Llandeilo Board of Guardians. A further three Guardians were elected to represent the Llandeilo Urban District.

Three Guardians were elected to represent the Ammanford Urban District which also lay within the remit of the Llandeilo Guardians. All three sitting members were returned unopposed.

In addition, following the formation of the new Cwmamman Urban District in 1912, a further three members were elected to represent that area.

Ammanford (three seats)

Cwmamman (three seats)

Llandeilo (three seats)

References

1913 Welsh local elections
Elections in Carmarthenshire
20th century in Carmarthenshire